Carlos Pérez García (born 14 January 1984) is a Spanish footballer who plays as a left winger.

Football career
Born in Albacete, Pérez started his professional career with hometown's Albacete Balompié. His potential was eventually spotted by Valencia's manager Rafael Benítez, who signed the 18-year-old to a five-year contract after he had made five first-team appearances with the Castile-La Mancha club in the second division.

During his stay with the Che, however, Pérez would be often loaned, only amassing a few callups to the main squad and being released for good in January 2007. Subsequently, he resumed his career in the third and fourth levels.

In the 2008 summer, Pérez joined Spartak Trnava in Slovakia for two years, being released after a sole season and going on to compete in Spanish amateur football until his retirement.

References

External links

1984 births
Living people
Sportspeople from Albacete
Spanish footballers
Footballers from Castilla–La Mancha
Association football wingers
Segunda División players
Segunda División B players
Tercera División players
Atlético Albacete players
Albacete Balompié players
Valencia CF Mestalla footballers
RCD Espanyol B footballers
CD Alcoyano footballers
CD Eldense footballers
AD Alcorcón footballers
Slovak Super Liga players
FC Spartak Trnava players
Spain youth international footballers
Spanish expatriate footballers
Expatriate footballers in Slovakia
Spanish expatriate sportspeople in Slovakia